Every Step of the Way is an album by American pianist David Benoit released in 1988, recorded for the GRP label. The album reached No. 4 on the Billboard Contemporary Jazz chart and received a 1989 Grammy Nomination for Best Contemporary Jazz Performance.

Track listing
All tracks composed by David Benoit; except where indicated
"Every Step of the Way" (David Benoit, Russ Freeman) – 4:04
"Shibuya Station" – 3:34
"The Key to You" (David Benoit, David Pack) – 5:04
"Remembering What You Said" – 4:34
"Once Running Free" – 2:46
"ReBach" (David Benoit, Nathan East) – 4:40
Sao Paulo" – 5:17
"No Worries (David Benoit, Nathan East) – 5:34
"I Just Can't Stop Loving You" (Michael Jackson) – 4:52
"Painted Desert" – 4:25
"Saturdays" – 4:15

Personnel 
 David Benoit – acoustic piano (1-5, 7, 9, 10, 11), arrangements (1), keyboards (2, 3, 5, 7), keyboard programming (2, 6), string arrangements and conductor (4), Kawai MIDI grand piano (6, 8, 10), synth solo (6), orchestra arrangements and conductor (6)
 Randy Waldman – keyboards (1, 2, 3, 6)
 Tom Ranier – keyboards (4, 7, 10, 11)
 Russ Freeman – lead guitar (1), arrangements (1)
 Michael Landau – rhythm guitar (1), guitars (2, 3, 8), guitar solo (6)
 Grant Geissman – guitars (4, 7, 10)
 Neil Stubenhaus – bass (1, 2)
 Nathan East – bass (3, 6), bass solo (8), vocals (8)
 Bob Feldman – bass (4, 7, 10)
 Stanley Clarke – acoustic bass (9, 11)
 John Robinson – drums (2, 3, 6, 8), drum programming (6)
 Tony Morales –  drums (4, 7, 10)
 Harvey Mason – drums (9, 11)
 Michael Fisher – percussion (1, 2, 6, 8)
 Brad Dutz – percussion (4, 7, 9, 10, 11)
 Luis Conte – percussion (7)
 Chris Smith – harmonica (2)
 Eric Marienthal – alto saxophone (2)
 Sam Riney – saxophone (4, 10)
 Bill Reichenbach, Jr. – trombone (3, 7)
 Gary Grant – trumpet (3, 7), flugelhorn (3, 7)
 Jerry Hey – trumpet (3, 7), horn arrangements (3, 7), flugelhorn (6, 7)
 Dave Valentin – flute (7)
 Bruce Dukov – concertmaster (6)
 Suzie Katayama – orchestra contractor (6)
 The Warfield Avenue Symphony Orchestra – orchestra (6)
 David Pack – lead vocals (3), vocal arrangements (3)
 Phillip Ingram – backing vocals (3)
 Jeff Pescetto – backing vocals (3)
 Chuck Sabatino – backing vocals (3)

Production 
 Producers – David Benoit and Jeffrey Weber 
 Executive Producers – Dave Grusin and Larry Rosen 
 Recorded and Mixed by Allen Sides 
 Recording and Mix Assistants – Bob Loftus and Bruce Wildstein
 Additional Recording – Josiah Gluck and Steve Hallmark
 Mixed at Ocean Way Recording (Hollywood, California).
 Editing – Bill Giolando
 Mastered by Bernie Grundman at Bernie Grundman Mastering (Hollywood, California).
 Music Preparation – Ken Gruberman 
 Music Coordinator – Tim Olsen
 Production Coordinator – Suzanne Sherman 
 Creative Director – Andy Baltimore 
 Album Design – Leslie Winther
 Photography – Kamron Hinatsu

Charts

References

External links
David Benoit-Every Step of the Way at Discogs
David Benoit-Every Step of the Way at AllMusic

1988 albums
GRP Records albums
David Benoit (musician) albums